This is a list of award winners from the now-defunct Australian Baseball League (1989-1999).

Batting Champion

Golden Glove

Manager of the Year

Most Valuable Player

Rookie of the Year

Reliever of the Year

Pitcher of the Year

Umpire of the Year

See also

References 

 

Australian Baseball League (1989–1999)
Baseball trophies and awards
Baseball League Awards